The 1968 United States Senate election in Louisiana was held on November 5, 1968.  Incumbent Democratic Senator Russell Long was elected to a fifth term in office.

On August 17, Long won the Democratic primary with 87.02% of the vote. At this time, Louisiana was a one-party state and the Democratic nomination was tantamount to victory. Long won the November general election without an opponent.

Democratic primary

Candidates
Maurice Blache
Russell Long, incumbent Senator

Results

General election

References

1968
Louisiana
United States Senate
Single-candidate elections